Inés Alder dal Farra (born 30 April 1970) is an Argentine former cross-country skier. She competed in four events at the 1992 Winter Olympics. She is the mother of Franco and Marco Dal Farra. She is the sister of Guillermo Alder.

References

External links
 

1970 births
Living people
Argentine female cross-country skiers
Olympic cross-country skiers of Argentina
Cross-country skiers at the 1992 Winter Olympics
Sportspeople from Bariloche